Released may refer to:

 Released (Jade Warrior album), 1971
 Released (Patti LaBelle album), 1980
 Released: 1985–1995, an album by Kronos Quartet, 1995
 Released, an album by Westlife, 2005
 "Released", a song by Norther from Dreams of Endless War, 2002

See also
 Release (disambiguation)